Gaston Ignacio Cantens (born October 25, 1961) is an American politician from Miami, Florida. Described as a "onetime influential member of the Florida House of Representatives", Cantens served on the body from 1998 to 2004, and at one time was considered likely to become its speaker. Cantens is currently a Vice President at Florida Crystals.

Early life and education 
Cantwens was born October 25, 1961 in Miami, Florida. Cantens' father, Gaston E. Cantens, was a former advisory board member at the Belen Jesuit Preparatory School and a local leader in the Cuban-American community.

Cantens graduated from Belen Jesuit Preparatory School in 1979. He then received a B.A. from the University of Miami in 1982 and graduated from St. Thomas University Law School in 1992.

Political career 
He worked as an Assistant State Attorney for the 11th Judicial Circuit of Florida (1995–1998).  He was a Director of the Dade County Bar Association (1996-1999) and a Director of the Cuban-American Bar Association (1997). He was also briefly the head basketball coach at Barry University.

Cantens was elected to the Florida House of Representatives as a Republican for District 114 in 1998 and reelected for two more terms. According to The New York Times, Cantens was considered likely to become Speaker of the Florida House in the early 2000s, but the position instead went to Marco Rubio. Rubio reportedly took the position over Gantens, who had desired the speakership, through the support of legislator Allan Bense.

Personal life 
Cantens is currently an executive of Florida Crystals Corporation and a leader of their public policy agenda. Cantens' father, Gaston E. Cantens, was sentenced to five years in prison on ponzi scheme charges in 2013.

References

External links 
Florida House of Representatives bio

1961 births
Living people
American politicians of Cuban descent
University of Miami alumni
St. Thomas University (Florida) alumni
Republican Party members of the Florida House of Representatives
Politicians from Miami
Barry Buccaneers men's basketball coaches
Hispanic and Latino American state legislators in Florida